Dearthrus is a genus of carpet beetles in the family Dermestidae. There are at least two described species in Dearthrus.

Species
These two species belong to the genus Dearthrus:
 Dearthrus longulus LeConte, 1863
 Dearthrus stebbinsi Beal, 1954

References

Further reading

 
 
 
 
 

Dermestidae
Articles created by Qbugbot